Bedford Corners Historic District is a historic district located at Portville in Cattaraugus County, New York. The district consists of three structures located at the intersection at New York State Route 305 and Deer Creek Road / Dodge Creek Road.  The structures are a two-story, "L" shaped, frame dwelling built about 1856 by early settler Jacob Bedford; a one-room schoolhouse built in 1864; and the Bedford Corners Cheese Factory / Grange Hall built after 1886.  The district also includes the  surrounding the structures.

It was listed on the National Register of Historic Places in 2003.

Gallery

References

External links

Historic districts on the National Register of Historic Places in New York (state)
Historic districts in Cattaraugus County, New York
National Register of Historic Places in Cattaraugus County, New York